Altenbochum is a statistical area and a district of the city of Bochum in the Ruhr area in North Rhine-Westphalia in Germany. Altenbochum is East of the central business district. Altenbochum lies between Gleisdreieck and Laer. Altenbochum is connected to Gelsenkirchen, the district Langendreer, central Witten and Heven (district of Witten) by tram. Tram lines 302 and 310 and several bus lines stop here.

Boroughs of Bochum